The 1993 The Citadel Bulldogs football team represented The Citadel, The Military College of South Carolina in the 1993 NCAA Division I-AA football season.  Charlie Taaffe served as head coach for the seventh season.  The Bulldogs played as members of the Southern Conference and played home games at Johnson Hagood Stadium.

Schedule

Ranking movements

References

Citadel Bulldogs
The Citadel Bulldogs football seasons
Citadel football